The Faribault Viaduct is a reinforced concrete highway bridge which carries Minnesota State Highway 60 over the Straight River in Faribault, Minnesota, United States.

It was constructed in 1937 by the Works Progress Administration with Art Deco/Classical Revival ornamentation, one of the last major examples in the state. The bridge has also been described as Moderne in style.

When listed on the National Register of Historic Places in 1989, it was noted as a civic project linking a city divided by a river and rail corridor.  The bridge was rebuilt in 2008-09 and the decks widened, but the original piers and the three arches over the river remain.

See also
 List of bridges on the National Register of Historic Places in Minnesota
 National Register of Historic Places listings in Rice County, Minnesota

References

1937 establishments in Minnesota
Bridges completed in 1937
Road bridges on the National Register of Historic Places in Minnesota
Buildings and structures in Rice County, Minnesota
Transportation in Rice County, Minnesota
National Register of Historic Places in Rice County, Minnesota
Works Progress Administration in Minnesota
Concrete bridges in the United States